William DeMeo is an American actor. He is known for his acting roles in Analyze That, First Kill and The Sopranos. He also played the role of Sammy Gravano in the 2018 film Gotti.

Career
His first acting role was in the 1993 film, A Bronx Tale, directed by Robert De Niro. He later went on to write, produce, and star in the films: One Deadly Road, Wannabes, Searching for Bobby D, Once Upon a Time in Brooklyn and Back in the Day. DeMeo also had a recurring role in the hit television series The Sopranos, in which he played the character Jason Molinaro. In 2016, he directed his first documentary film, Cruisin 86th St., which focused on the story of his neighborhood in the ‘70s, ‘80s and early ‘90s. DeMeo developed a television series called The Neighborhood, set in 1980s Brooklyn, which follows the story of a mob soldier looking to leave behind his life of crime.

Filmography

Film

Television

Video games

References

External links

1971 births
American film directors
American people of Italian descent
Film producers from New York (state)
American male film actors
American male television actors
American male video game actors
American male voice actors
Living people
Male actors from New York City